Nicolas-Louis de Durfort  was a French Navy officer. He served in the War of American Independence.

Biography 
Durfort joined the Navy as a Garde-Marine on 23 March 1756. He was promoted to Lieutenant on 1 May 1763.

In 1772, he commanded the 20-gun xebec Séduisant. In 1776, he was given command of the 18-gun corvette Flèche, part of the squadron under Du Chaffault. 

Durfort was promoted to Captain on 4 April 1777, and commanded the 26-gun frigate Atalante, attached to the Eastern Mediterranean squadron.

In 1780, he commanded the 74-gun Scipion. 

He commanded the 80-gun Bourgogne at the Battle of Cape Henry on 16 March 1781.

He was promoted to Chef de Division on 1 May 1786, and given command of the 7th Squadron.

Sources and references 
 Notes

Citations

Bibliography
 
 

External links
 

French Navy officers
French military personnel of the American Revolutionary War